Plumstead Common Windmill is a tower mill in Plumstead Common, in the Royal Borough of Greenwich, in south London.

History

Plumstead Common Windmill was marked on the 1819-43 Ordnance Survey map. In 1827, there was an accident at the mill when so many people crowded onto the stage to watch a sham fight that it gave way, injuring a number of them. In 1848, the mill was converted into a brewhouse, having been disused for a number of years previously. The tower remains today, as part of the Old Mill pub.

Description

Plumstead Common Mill has a four-storey brick tower. It had four common sails. There was a stage at first floor level. The mill had a domed cap and was winded by hand.

Millers

Longmore 1827
Clements

References

External links
Windmill World page on the mill.

Windmills in London
Grinding mills in the United Kingdom
Tower mills in the United Kingdom
Buildings and structures in the Royal Borough of Greenwich
Tourist attractions in the Royal Borough of Greenwich